Adlerzia is a genus of ant in the subfamily Myrmicinae containing the single species Adlerzia froggatti.

References

External links

Myrmicinae
Monotypic ant genera